O-806 is a drug which is a cannabinoid derivative that is used in scientific research. It is described as a mixed agonist/antagonist at the cannabinoid receptor CB1, meaning that it acts as an antagonist when co-administered alongside a more potent CB1 agonist, but exhibits weak partial agonist effects when administered by itself.

References 

Cannabinoids
Benzochromenes
Phenols
Alkyne derivatives
Organobromides